Maidman is a surname. Notable people with the surname include:

Daniel Maidman (born 1975), American artist
Jennifer Maidman (born 1958 as Ian Maidman), British musician, singer, producer, songwriter, actor, and author

See also
Maiman
Saidman

Surnames of English origin